Chiangrai United Football Club (Thai: สโมสรฟุตบอลเชียงราย ยูไนเต็ด) is a professional Football Club based in Chiangrai  Province. The club plays in the Thai League 1. The club is also known as The Beetles.

History

First years
In 2009, Chiangrai United joined the new Thai football setup and started at the 3rd level, 2009 Regional League Division 2 Northern Region. Chiangrai duly came out on top come to the end of the regular league season, thus claiming their first-ever championship and also crowned as the first-ever winners of the Regional League Northern Division.

On winning the championship, Chiangrai entered the 2009 Regional League Division 2, an end of season mini-league for all 5 Regional League Division 2 championship-winning teams, and finished as runners-up and promoted to Thai Division 1 League.

Second Division and League 1 Promotion
In 2010, the club finished 3rd in Thai Division 1 League and first-ever promoted to the top tier Thai League 1.

Chiangrai United opened its first youth academies in 2012.

In 2016, Chiangrai United made a deal with Jarken Group to the strong brand and initiating a holistic marketing strategy which included business development and strengthening management structures to promote a positive image of the Chiangrai United Sports Passions as a brand to make Chiangrai United become professional and sustainable. The strategy for this deal is to design to promote Chaing Rai United to become the big name club in Thailand.

2017 & 2018 – FA Cup winners

In 2017, the club continued to make agreements with sponsors to improve the club's professional image and attract Tanaboon Kesarat. They also secured players such as; Vander Luiz, Felipe Azevedo, Henrique Silva.

Under Brazilian coach Alexandre Gama, The Beetles was victorious in the 2017 FA Cup Final with Bangkok United. This proved to be a case of redemption for Chiangrai as winning the first piece of silverware in club-history, three days after losing to Muangthong United in the League Cup final.

In 2018, the club attracted Lee Yong-Rae and Bill.

Chiangrai defeated the 2017 Liga 1 runners-up Bali United 3–2 in a qualifying preliminary round 2 and losing the 2017 Chinese Super League to runners-up Shanghai SIPG 1–0 in a qualifying play-offs round for the AFC Champions League group stages.

In 2018 FA Cup Final, The Beetles weathered certain things Thai League 1 winners Buriram United could hurl at them at Supachalasai Stadium to record a 3–2 victory, a hat-trick by Bill.

2019 – League 1 title

Chiangrai defeated the 2018 Myanmar National League champions Yangon United 3–1 in a qualifying preliminary round 2 and drew the 2018 J1 League runners-up Sanfrecce Hiroshima in a qualifying play-offs round for the AFC Champions League group stages; the match finished 0–0 after extra time, with Chiangrai losing the penalty shoot-out 4–3 at Hiroshima Big Arch.

In October 2019, after the announcement of the appointment of Ailton dos Santos Silva as the new head coach, The Beetles won the Thai League 1 for the first time. Chiangrai United and Buriram United ended up with identical 58 points from 30 matches. However, they were declared the winners of the league on the basis of a better head-to-head record, Chiangrai held Buriram to a goalless draw away in the first leg in April then thrashed the northeastern giants 4 to nothing at home in July, Chiangrai United is the third to win the top flight after Buriram and Muangthong since the country's premier tournament was revamped in 2009.

The side is commented to fare well in most big games, with compactness and discipline springing surprises. Instead of being burdened with keeping possession, they stifled opponents with a rehearsed repertoire of both defensive and pressing moves, topped off with lethal counter-attacks.

Academy development
Chiangrai United opened its first youth academies in 2012. The club also regularly supplies the Thai national youth teams and Chiangrai first team squad with local talent such as Ekanit Panya, Chotipat Poomkaew, Apirak Worawong, Pharadon Pattanapol, Sarawut Yodyinghathaikul and Thakdanai Jaihan. Chiangrai youth academies play in Thailand Youth League.

Shirt sponsor

Stadium

Main articles: Leo Chiangrai Stadium, Mae Fah Luang University Stadium

Chiangrai United's home ground is the United Stadium of Chiangrai, which has also been known as the Leo Chiangrai Stadium  since October 2021 due to sponsorship commitments. The stadium is situated in Chiang Rai Province, Thailand. The Leo Chiangrai Stadium is near Mae Fah Luang International Airport and has a capacity of 11,354 people.

Locations by season

Continental record

Performance in AFC competitions
AFC Champions League: 5 appearances
 2018: Play-off round
 2019: Play-off round
 2020: Group stage
 2021: Group stage
 2022: Group stage

Season by season record

P = Played
W = Games won
D = Games drawn
L = Games lost
F = Goals for
A = Goals against
Pts = Points
Pos = Final position
N/A = No answer

TL = Thai League 1

QR1 = First Qualifying Round
QR2 = Second Qualifying Round
QR3 = Third Qualifying Round
QR4 = Fourth Qualifying Round
RInt = Intermediate Round
R1 = Round 1
R2 = Round 2
R3 = Round 3

R4 = Round 4
R5 = Round 5
R6 = Round 6
GR = Group stage
QF = Quarter-finals
SF = Semi-finals
RU = Runners-up
S = Shared
W = Winners

Players

First team squad

Out on loan

Managerial history

 Sarith Wutchuay 
 Thawatchai Damrong-Ongtrakul 
 Apisit Imampai 
 Kajohn Punnaves 
 Rungsimun Songkrohtham 
 Stefano Cugurra Teco 
 Henk Wisman 
 Anurak Srikerd 
 Teerasak Po-on 
 Alexandre Gama 
 Jose Alves Borges 
 Ailton dos Santos Silva 
 Masami Taki 
 Emerson Pereira (caretaker) 
 Emerson Pereira 
 Gabriel Magalhães

Honours

Domestic competitions

League
Thai League 1
 Winners (1) : 2019
 Thai Division 1 League
 Third place (1): 2010
 Regional League Northern Region
 Winners (1) : 2009
 Regional League Division 2
 Runners-up (1): 2009

Cups
 FA Cup
 Winners (3) : 2017, 2018, 2020–21
 League Cup
 Winners (1) : 2018
 Runners-up (1): 2017
 Thailand Champions Cup
 Winners (2) : 2018, 2020
 Runners-up (1): 2019, 2021

Double
Thai FA Cup and Thailand Champions Cup: 2020–21

Treble
Thai FA Cup, Thai League Cup and Thailand Champions Cup: 2018

References

External links
 Official Website chiangraiunited football club

 
Thai League 1 clubs
Football clubs in Thailand
Association football clubs established in 2009
Sport in Chiang Rai province
2009 establishments in Thailand